Michael Balling (27 August 1866 in Heidingsfeld, near Würzburg – 1 September 1925 in Darmstadt) was a German violist and conductor.  He served as principal conductor of The Hallé, Manchester, England from 1912 to 1914.

Balling studied violin with Hermann Ritter at the Hochschule für Musik Würzburg and was an early convert to the viola alta, a large scale viola introduced by Ritter in 1876.  By the late 1880s, Balling had established himself as a viola player of some note playing the instrument with great success in Wagner operas at the Bayreuth Festival, and later conducted there from 1906 to 1909 and 1914.  Balling also promoted the viola alta in England. In 1910 he was the conductor of the Denhof Opera Company

Sources

References

1866 births
1925 deaths
German conductors (music)
German male conductors (music)
German classical violists
19th-century German musicians
19th-century German male musicians